Kizhakkunarum Pakshi is a 1991 Indian Malayalam-language musical tragedy drama film written and directed by Venu Nagavalli and produced by P. K. R. Pillai. It stars Mohanlal, Shankar, Murali, Rekha, Jagathy Sreekumar, Ashokan and Innocent. The music and background score of the film was composed by Raveendran

Cast
Mohanlal as Ananthan / Ananthu
Shankar as Gopi Krishnan
Rekha as Meera
Murali as Johny, Anandhu's Friend 
Nedumudi Venu as Music Director Varma
Jagathy Sreekumar as Vaidy, Anandhu's Friend 
Jagadish as Anandhu's Friend 
Ashokan as Anandhu's Friend 
Santhosh as Anandhu's Friend
Jyothi as Nimmy
Innocent as Panicker
Kaviyoor Ponnamma as Devu, Ananthu's Mother
Karamana Janardanan Nair as Krishnan Nampoothiri,  Ananthu's Father
Mala Aravindan as Nanappan
Nandhu as Anandhu's Friend 
Sankaradi as Ananthu's uncle
Thikkurissy Sukumaran Nair as former Music director Moorthy
T. P. Madhavan as Pillai
 Ajayan Adoor
Sukumari as Doctor Aunty, Nimmy's mother
Unnimary as Girija, Meera's Mother

Production
Shankar played an antagonistic character for the first time in his career.

Songs
 "Souparikamritha Veechikal Padum" - K. J. Yesudas (Raga: Udayaravichandrika of)written by K Jayakumar IAS
 "Souparikamritha Veechikal Padum" - Minmini (Raga: Udayaravichandrika)
 "Hey Krishna" - K. S. Chitra, Chorus (Raga: Charukesi)
 "Kizhakunarumpakshi" - K. J. Yesudas, Sujatha, Chorus
 "Aruna Kiranam" - K. J. Yesudas, K. S. Chitra (Raga: Lavangi)

Awards
 Kerala Film Critics Award for Best Female Playback Singer - Sujatha

References

External links
 

1991 films
1990s Malayalam-language films
1990s musical films
Films directed by Venu Nagavally
Films scored by Raveendran